Oru Kuprasidha Payyan is a 2018 Indian Malayalam-language crime thriller film directed by Madhupal and written by Jeevan Job Thomas and produced by V Cinemas International. The film stars Tovino Thomas, Nimisha Sajayan and Anu Sithara in lead roles. It released on 7 November 2018 coinciding with Deepavali. The film is based on sensational Sundari Amma murder case.

Plot
Ajayan is a timid young man who works in a nearby hotel. He often travels to meet Chenbakam who runs a catering service and supplies idlis to the hotel where Ajayan is working. He shares a bond with Chenbakam as she treats him like her own son. Ajayan and Jalaja wish to marry each other.

One dark night, a loud noise is heard from Chenbakam's house around 12:30 am. It is found that Chenbakam has been stabbed and she was struggling for her life. Neighbours see a person running from the spot. Chenbakam died on the way to the hospital and the police is informed about the incident.

For one year, the case did not end and the culprits are not found by the local police. This led to frustration among the public and the case is transferred to the Crime Branch. Pressurized, the crime branch police decided to fix Ajayan as the culprit to solve the case. They created suitable evidence to fix Ajayan as the murderer.

Ajayan accepted the crime because of the torture that he had experienced by the police. While in remand, a convict asks him to appeal to the judge to fix a lawyer for him on his side. The court points to Hanna as the legal aid for Ajayan. Initially, she hesitates to take the case, but after unraveling the truth behind the case, she shows real interest in it.

Hanna proves Ajayan innocent after a series of investigations and arguments in court. She won the case against her former senior lawyer, Santosh Narayan.

Cast

Production
Principal photography took place in Vadayar, Vaikom, Kottayam.

Release
The film released on 8 November 2018.

Accolades

References

External links
 

2010s Malayalam-language films
Indian thriller films
2018 films
2018 thriller films